Canley railway station is situated in Canley, Coventry, in the West Midlands of England.  The station, and all trains serving it, are operated by West Midlands Railway.

It is situated on the edge of Coventry Business Park, to the west of the Earlsdon area of Coventry, and close to the University of Warwick. It has two platforms, a small booking office and waiting room.

History
The station was opened on 30 September 1940 and was originally known as Canley Halt, the 'Halt' suffix was dropped in 1968. It was built primarily to serve the Standard Motor Company works alongside, with platforms long enough to take eight coaches. The original station buildings were rebuilt in 1995.

There was a railway level crossing adjacent to the station until June 2004  when the road was closed and a footbridge was built over the railway line. Level crossings at Berkswell railway station and Tile Hill railway station were removed around the same time to upgrade the line for more high speed trains.

Facilities
The station has a ticket office located on platform 1 which is open Monday 07:00-13:00 and 15:00-18:00, Tuesday-Thursday 07:00-12:00, Friday 07:00-19:00, Saturday 08:00-16:00 and Sunday 10:00-12:00. When the ticket office is open tickets must be purchased before boarding the train. Outside of these times there is a ticket machine outside the ticket office which accepts card payments only - cash and voucher payments can be made to the senior conductor on the train.

There are 3 car parks for the station on Canley Road - 2 are located on the Birmingham-bound side of the railway and another on the London-bound side. All car parks are free for rail users. Cycle parking is also available.

Step free access is available between the platforms via the ramp. Station staff provide information and assistance whilst the ticket office is open. Outside of these hours information is available from help points located on both platforms and from the senior conductor on the train. Canley station is accredited by the Secure Station Scheme.

Services
Canley is served by two trains per hour each way, to  northbound and to  via  southbound. There are extra services towards  in the morning peak.

All services are operated by West Midlands Trains. Most services are operated under the London Northwestern Railway brand but some services (mainly early morning and late night services which start/terminate at ) operate under the West Midlands Railway brand.

References

External links
Canley station at warwickshirerailways.com

Railway stations in Coventry
DfT Category E stations
Former London, Midland and Scottish Railway stations
Railway stations in Great Britain opened in 1940
Railway stations served by West Midlands Trains